The Devil Worshippers is a six-chapter 1921 silent German film written by Marie Luise Droop, directed by Muhsin Ertuğrul and featuring Carl de Vogt in the title-role of Kara Ben Nemsi. De Vogt's career as an actor stretched into the 1960s, where he appeared in a number of the then-popular German crimi films. Later horror-star Béla Lugosi is also featured in one of his first supporting roles in a film, although his precise role in the film is unknown (some sources say he played a character called Pir Kamek).

The film was an adaptation of two Karl May novels (The Desert and Wild Kurdistan). It was one of the first German films to be based on the works of Karl May, who was normally known for his novels set in the old American West).

This film was the first of a trilogy of the production company "Ustad-Film" starring actor Carl de Vogt, but it was only released as the third in the cinemas. In several scenes, this black-and-white film has some coloring, e.g. blue for night scenes.

The film is said to have premiered on 2 January 1921 at "Vaters Lichtspiele" at Würzburg, but the first showing is only documented for 14 January 1921 at Wilhelmsburg. The film is now considered to be lost.

Plot
The film is about a cult of devil worshippers called the Jesidi whose village is destroyed by an army general named Machrej under a religious pretext. When the village leader Kara ben Nemsi sees the devastation and learns that his people have been taken into captivity, he vows revenge. The ben Nemsi character, and his faithful servant Hadschi Halef Omar, appeared later in several other Karl May novels, all set in the Near East.

Cast
 Carl de Vogt as Kara Ben Nemsi
 Meinhart Maur as Hadschi Halef Omar
 Tronier Funder as Officer
 Béla Lugosi as Pir Kamek
 Fred Immler
 Ilya Dubrowski
 Gustav Kirchberg
 Erwin Baron

See also
 Karl May film adaptations
 Béla Lugosi filmography

References

External links

1921 films
1921 lost films
1921 adventure films
German adventure films
German silent feature films
German black-and-white films
Films of the Weimar Republic
Films based on the Orient Cycle
Films directed by Muhsin Ertuğrul
Films set in the 19th century
Lost German films
Lost adventure films
Silent adventure films
1920s German films